Stephen Tobin (1836 – October 10, 1905) was a Canadian merchant and political figure. He represented Halifax in the House of Commons of Canada from 1872 to 1874 as a Liberal member.

He was born in Halifax, Nova Scotia, the son of Thomas S. Tobin and grandson of Michael Tobin. He was educated in England. Tobin ran unsuccessfully for a seat in the Nova Scotia Assembly in 1867. In 1868, he married Katharine Grey. Tobin served as mayor of Halifax from 1867 to 1870 and from 1878 to 1881. He was Danish consul at Halifax. Tobin also served as a commissioner of public schools. He died in Montreal at the age of 69.

References 

1836 births
1905 deaths
Liberal Party of Canada MPs
Members of the House of Commons of Canada from Nova Scotia
Mayors of Halifax, Nova Scotia